Mobile Bay is a shallow inlet of the Gulf of Mexico, lying within the state of Alabama in the United States. Its mouth is formed by the Fort Morgan Peninsula on the eastern side and Dauphin Island, a barrier island on the western side. The Mobile River and Tensaw River empty into the northern end of the bay, making it an estuary. Several smaller rivers also empty into the bay: Dog River, Deer River, and Fowl River on the western side of the bay, and Fish River on the eastern side. Annually, and often several times during the summer months, the fish and crustaceans will swarm the shallow coastline and shore of the bay. This event, appropriately named a jubilee, draws a large crowd because of the abundance of fresh, easily caught seafood.

History 
Long occupied by cultures of indigenous peoples, this area was still under the chiefs of Mississippian culture at the time of Hernando de Soto's exploration.

The recorded history of Mobile Bay begins about 1500, when Spanish explorers were sailing into the area. On early maps, the bay was named as Bahía del Espíritu Santo (Bay of the Holy Spirit). The area was explored in more detail in 1516 by Diego Miruelo and in 1519 by Alonso Álvarez de Pineda. In 1528, Pánfilo de Narváez travelled through what was likely the Mobile Bay area, encountering Native Americans who fled and burned their towns at the approach of the expedition. This response was a prelude to the journeys of Hernando de Soto, more than eleven years later.

European exploration into the region 

Hernando de Soto explored the area of Mobile Bay and beyond in 1540, finding the area inhabited by indigenous Mississippian culture people. During this expedition his forces destroyed the fortified town of Mauvila, also spelled Maubila, from which the name Mobile was later derived. It was a town of the paramount Chief Tuscaloosa, located in inland Alabama, well to the north of the current site of Mobile. The next large expedition was that of Tristán de Luna y Arellano, in his unsuccessful attempt to establish a permanent colony for Spain nearby at Pensacola in 1559.

Although Spain's presence in the area had been sporadic, in 1702 French colonists created a deep-sea port at Dauphin Island and founded French Louisiana's capital at Mobile, a few miles north of Mobile Bay on the Mobile River. Following a series of floods, the original settlement of Fort Louis de la Mobile was relocated in 1711 to the head of Mobile Bay.

Role in wars 
During the American Civil War Mobile Bay was used as a major port for blockade runners bringing in badly needed supplies for the Confederacy. On August 5, 1864, Admiral David Farragut led a Union flotilla through Confederate defenses and sealed off one of the last major Southern ports of the bay in the Battle of Mobile Bay. A number of Civil War-era shipwrecks remain in Mobile Bay, including American Diver, CSS Gaines, CSS Huntsville, USS Philippi, CSS Phoenix, USS Rodolph, USS Tecumseh, and CSS Tuscaloosa.

Mobile's role as a seaport has continued to the present day, though the commodities have changed through time. Cotton was the chief commodity in the nineteenth century. During the Second World War, Mobile's shipbuilding industry expanded, and the city's population surged as both black and white migrants moved there for work. Growth has been rapid since then.

Natural disasters in the area 
The city has endured several devastating hurricanes in its history, the most recent being Hurricane Frederic in 1979 and Hurricane Katrina in 2005. Areas of low elevation, including the downtown business district, have been flooded repeatedly in hurricanes.

On September 13, 1979, Hurricane Frederic entered the bay with winds reaching , destroying the bridge to Dauphin Island. Downtown Mobile was flooded several feet, and the south-end towns of Bayou La Batre and Bon Secour were severely damaged. Dozens of vessels of various sizes were left stranded inland.

Shoreline towns 

The city of Mobile is situated at the head of the bay on the western shore. On the Eastern Shore of the bay are found several small communities, including Spanish Fort, Daphne, Fairhope, Point Clear, and Bon Secour. The town of Gulf Shores lies just outside the bay, on the Fort Morgan peninsula, while the town of Fort Morgan is located directly south of the bay. The Middle Bay Lighthouse has been located in the center of the bay since 1885.

The head of the bay is crossed by two major thoroughfares, Interstate 10, known as the Jubilee Parkway , and US 90/US 98, known as the Battleship Parkway. These two bridges serve as the primary connections between the city of Mobile and the Eastern Shore. On warm summer nights, the residents living around Mobile Bay sometimes enjoy the fruits of a mysterious natural phenomenon called a Jubilee, when fish and crabs swarm toward shore and can be easily harvested by people wading in the shallows.

See also
Gulf Islands National Seashore - offshore islands, includes nearby states.
Gaillard Island
Mobile-Tensaw River Delta

References

External links

Mobile Baykeeper - local Waterkeeper Alliance group

 
Bodies of water of Baldwin County, Alabama
Bodies of water of Mobile County, Alabama
Bays of Alabama
Estuaries of the United States
Alabama placenames of Native American origin